Goth is a 2008 Japanese drama film directed by Gen Takahashi. The film stars Kanata Hongô, Rin Takanashi, Kunihiko Ida, Mika Kamiya and Kôtarô Kano in the lead roles. It is based on the novel Goth by Otsuichi.

Cast
 Kanata Hongô
 Rin Takanashi
 Kunihiko Ida
 Mika Kamiya
 Kôtarô Kano
 Chika Kumagai
 Toshinobu Matsuo
 Keishi Nagatsuka

References

External links
 
 

2000s Japanese-language films
2008 films
2008 drama films
Films shot in Japan
Japanese drama films
2000s Japanese films